Sir George Cockburn, 10th Baronet was a British naval commander.

George Cockburn may also refer to:

George Cockburn (Saskatchewan politician) (1876–1966), politician in Saskatchewan, Canada
George Ralph Richardson Cockburn (1834–1912), politician in Ontario, Canada
George Bertram Cockburn (1872–1931), British research chemist and aviation pioneer
George H. I. Cockburn (1889–1957), politician in New Brunswick, Canada

See also
George Cockburne (died 1770), naval administrator
George Coburn (1920–2009), Irish politician
Cockburn (surname)